Port Allen is a place name that could refer to:

Port Allen Airport
Port Allen, Hawaii
Port Allen, Iowa
Port Allen, Louisiana